The 1928 Bulgarian State Football Championship was the fifth edition of the competition. It was contested by 5 teams, and Slavia Sofia won the championship, defeating Vladislav Varna 4–0 in the final.

Qualified teams
The winners from each OSO qualify for the State championship.

Quarter-finals

|}

Semi-finals

|}

Final

Notes

References
Bulgaria - List of final tables (RSSSF)

Bulgarian State Football Championship seasons
1